Chania Rock Festival is a rock festival held in Chania, Greece.
The festival's history begins back in 2002.
It is located right in the middle of the old city of Chania, next to the famous old port of the city. It is an old Venetian Bastion facing the sea.

2017 lineup

2016 lineup

2015 lineup

2014 lineup

2013 lineup

2012 lineup

2011 lineup

2010 lineup

2009 lineup

2008 lineup

2002 lineup

External links
Chania Rock Festival official Website (in Greek)

Rock festivals in Greece
Heavy metal festivals in Greece
Music festivals in Greece
Summer events in Greece